The Jung Shoe Manufacturing Company Factory at 620 S. Eighth St. in Sheboygan, Wisconsin, United States, was built in 1906.  It was designed by architect William C. Weeks.  It was listed on the National Register of Historic Places in 1992.

References

Industrial buildings and structures on the National Register of Historic Places in Wisconsin
Neoclassical architecture in Wisconsin
Industrial buildings completed in 1906
Buildings and structures in Sheboygan, Wisconsin
Shoe factories
National Register of Historic Places in Sheboygan County, Wisconsin
1906 establishments in Wisconsin